Marriott bombing may refer to:
2003 Marriott Hotel bombing in Jakarta, Indonesia
2008 Marriott Hotel bombing in Islamabad, Pakistan
2009 Jakarta bombings in Jakarta, Indonesia